Asuran means demon in several Indian languages and may refer to:

 Asuran (1983 film), a 1983 Indian Malayalam film
 Asuran (1995 film), a Tamil language science fiction horror film
 Asuran (2019 film), an Indian Tamil language action drama film
 Asuran (Stargate), a fictional artificial life-form in Stargate Atlantis

See also
Asura (disambiguation)